Zhuguang may refer to:

 Zhuguang Subdistrict, Guangzhou, a subdistrict of Yuexiu District in Guangzhou
 Zhuguang station, a Shenzhen Metro station
 Zhuguang Road station, a Shanghai Metro station